Albert Bassermann (7 September 1867 – 15 May 1952) was a German stage and screen actor. He was considered to be one of the greatest German-speaking actors of his generation and received the famous Iffland-Ring. He was married to Elsa Schiff with whom he frequently performed.

Life and career

Bassermann began his acting career in 1887 in Mannheim, his birthplace, after he began to study chemistry at the Technical University of Karlsruhe in 1884/85. He then moved to Berlin.  From 1899, he worked for Otto Brahm. He began work at the Deutsches Theater Berlin from 1904, the same year that his future wife, actress Elsa Bassermann (née Schiff), moved to Berlin to work at that same theater. In 1909, the year after they married, he started working at the Lessing Theatre, though he also continued at the Deutsches Theater, working there with Max Reinhardt from 1909 to 1915. Roles included Othello in 1910, Faust Part II with Friedrich Kayssler in 1911, Shylock in The Merchant of Venice and August Strindberg's The Storm with Gertrud Eysoldt in 1913.

Bassermann was among the first German theatre actors who worked in film.  In 1913, he played the main role of the lawyer in Max Mack's Der Andere (The Other), after the play by Paul Lindau. In 1915, he appeared in Egmont (play) with :de:Victor Barnowsky at the :de:Deutsches Künstlertheater. He also worked with German silent film directors Richard Oswald, Ernst Lubitsch, Leopold Jessner and Lupu Pick. In 1928 he appeared in the first staging of Carl Zuckmayer's Katharina Knie, and in November that year in Herr Lambertier by Verneuil
In 1933, Bassermann left Germany and lived in Switzerland, then moved to the United States in 1938.

Annija Simsone, who played opposite Bassermann in the Neue Wiener Buehne Theater in the 1920s, wrote the following in her autobiography: "During the Hitler era, Bassermann did not perform in Germany, though Adolf Hitler personally held him in high regard; Elsa was Jewish. Bassermann was told that if he wanted to continue to perform in Germany, he would have to get divorced. He did not get divorced, but Elsa and he went to Switzerland instead."

Although his ability to speak English was very limited, he learned lines phonetically with assistance from his wife and found work as a character actor. For his performance as the Dutch statesman Van Meer in Alfred Hitchcock's Foreign Correspondent, Bassermann was nominated for an Academy Award as Best Supporting Actor in 1940.  He returned to Europe in 1946. His final film appearance was in The Red Shoes.

In her acting textbook Respect for Acting, actress Uta Hagen said:
"One of the finest lessons I ever learned was from the great German actor Albert Basserman. I worked with him as Hilde in The Master Builder by Ibsen. He was already past eighty but was as 'modern' in his conception of the role of Solness and in his techniques as anyone I've ever seen or played with. In rehearsals he felt his way with the new cast. (The role had been in his repertoire for almost forty years.) He watched us, listened to us, adjusted to us, meanwhile executing his actions with only a small part of his playing energy.  At the first dress rehearsal, he started to play fully. There was such a vibrant reality to the rhythm of his speech and behavior that I was swept away by it. I kept waiting for him to come to an end with his intentions so that I could take my 'turn.' As a result, I either made a big hole in the dialogue or desperately cut in on him in order to avoid another hole. I was expecting the usual 'It's your turn; then it's my turn.' At the end of the first act I went to his dressing room and said, 'Mr. Basserman, I can't apologize enough, but I never know when you're through!' He looked at me in amazement and said, 'I'm never through! And neither should you be.'"

Death
Bassermann died on May 16, 1952, at or near the Zurich Airport, soon after his flight from the United States had arrived. He is buried in Mannheim.

Filmography

See also

 List of German-speaking Academy Award winners and nominees

References

Sources

External links
 
 Photographs of Albert Bassermann
 

German male film actors
German male silent film actors
German male stage actors
Iffland-Ring
Actors from Mannheim
1867 births
1952 deaths
German expatriate male actors in the United States
20th-century German male actors